Wilsden is a civil parish in the metropolitan borough of the City of Bradford, West Yorkshire, England.  It contains 19 listed buildings that are recorded in the National Heritage List for England.  All the listed buildings are designated at Grade II, the lowest of the three grades, which is applied to "buildings of national importance and special interest".  The parish contains the village of Wilsden and the surrounding countryside.  Most of the listed buildings are houses and cottages, farmhouses and farm buildings.  The other listed buildings include a public house, a former school, a folly, a former mill, a railway viaduct, and a Sunday school.


Buildings

References

Citations

Sources

 

Lists of listed buildings in West Yorkshire